Sulaimania is a genus of Southeast Asian araneomorph spiders in the family Tetrablemmidae that was first described by Pekka T. Lehtinen in 1981.  it contains two species, found in Malaysia and Singapore: S. brevis and S. vigelandi.

See also
 List of Tetrablemmidae species

References

External links

Araneomorphae genera
Taxa named by Pekka T. Lehtinen
Tetrablemmidae